Below is a complete list of the Maltese records in swimming, which are ratified by the Aquatic Sports Association of Malta.

Long course (50 m)

Men

Women

Mixed relay

Short Course (25 m)

Men

Women

Mixed relay

References
General
Maltese Long Course Records 17 December 2022 updated
Maltese Short Course Records 17 December 2022 updated
Specific

External links
ASA Malta official website

Malta
Records
Swimming